Alacuppidae is a family of often colorful, medium-sized, sea slugs, marine opisthobranch gastropod mollusks.

Genera
 Alacuppa Oskars, Bouchet & Malaquias, 2015
 Mimatys Habe, 1952
 Roxania Leach, 1847
Synonyms
 † Abderospira Dall, 1896: synonym of Roxania Leach, 1847
 Leucophysema Dall, 1908: synonym of Roxania Leach, 1847

References

External links
 Oskars T.R., Bouchet P. & Malaquias M.A. (2015). A new phylogeny of the Cephalaspidea (Gastropoda: Heterobranchia) based on expanded taxon sampling and gene markers. Molecular Phylogenetics and Evolution. 89: 130-150

Gastropod families